The Mangamuka River is a river of the far north of the Northland Region of New Zealand's North Island.

See also
List of rivers of New Zealand

References

Hokianga
Rivers of the Northland Region
Rivers of New Zealand